Olena Shablii ( 21 December 1975 Kyiv, Ukraine head of the Center of Intercultural Specialized Communication and Terminology Harmonization at the Science Park "Taras Shevchenko University of Kyiv", teacher at the National Taras Shevcehno University of Kyiv, Ukraine. Since 1998 she has been teaching translation studies and legal German at the Taras Shevchenko National University of Kyiv (since 2012 at the Faculty of Law, Department of Foreign Languages).

Dissertations
2002 – 1st (candidate's) dissertation ‘Interlingual Terminological Homonymy as a Problem of Terminological Lexicography and Translation Studies’; 2013 – 2nd (doctor's) dissertation ‘Theoretical Bases and Methodology of German-Ukrainian Legal Translation’. Olena Shablii has published several books ‘Translation of Legal Texts’ (2008), German-Ukrainian Legal Translation: Methods, Problems, Prospects (2012), is co-author of ‘Weißbuch zur Reform der ukrainischen Juristischen Ausbildung: Deutsch-Ukrainische Erfahrungen’ (2015) and author of over 50 papers in peer-reviewed journals.

Olena Shablii was visiting professor at the Herder-Institute of the University Leipzig, Germany (2011), Bologna University, Italy (2014), Ludwig Maximilian University of Munich, Germany (2015). Since 2015 President of the NGO German-Ukrainian Jurisprudential Dialogue, coordinator of several German-Ukrainian projects (among them several conferences and workshops on Reform of Ukrainian legal education, German-Ukrainian Legal Translation School etc.).

References 

1975 births
Living people
Ukrainian translators
Taras Shevchenko National University of Kyiv alumni
Ukrainian philologists
Academic staff of the Taras Shevchenko National University of Kyiv